Reshanda Gray (born June 1, 1993) is an American professional basketball player for the Los Angeles Sparks of the Women's National Basketball Association (WNBA). She played college basketball for the California Golden Bears and was named the Pac-12 Conference Player of the Year as a senior in 2015. She was drafted by the Minnesota Lynx in the 2015 WNBA draft.

Early life
Born in Los Angeles, California, Gray grew up in a low-income family, moving from place to place. At age 11, she and her six siblings settled in a one-room apartment long-term. She and her siblings were put into foster care, due to her parents drug use. She attended Bret Harte Middle School, where she first played basketball. After middle school she attended Washington Prep, where she played volleyball, track, and basketball.

College
At the University of California, Berkeley, Gray helped lead the Golden Bears to its first NCAA Final Four in 2013. In the 2013-14 season she scored 43 points and 16 rebound against Washington State. She ended that season averaging 17.6 points and 9 rebounds. In her senior season of 2014–15, Gray was named Pac-12 Player of the Year by the league's head coaches, although she would lose out to Oregon State's Ruth Hamblin for the media version of the award.

California statistics
Source

Professional career

WNBA
Gray was drafted with the 16th pick in the second round of the 2015 WNBA Draft by the Minnesota Lynx. After 10 games played with the Lynx, Gray was acquired by the Atlanta Dream along with teammate Damiris Dantas in a three-team trade deal that sent Érika de Souza to the Chicago Sky and Sylvia Fowles to the Lynx midway through the season. For the rest of the season, Gray averaged a career-high in scoring for the Dream as a reserve. During the 2016 season, Gray had career highs in scoring and rebounding in a win against the Dallas Wings where she scored 22 points along with 10 rebounds in one of her five starts of the season for the Dream. On January 26, 2017, Gray was traded to the Connecticut Sun in exchange for Aneika Henry. In May 2017, Gray was waived by the Sun following training camp. On February 28, 2018, the New York Liberty signed Gray to a training camp contract.

Gray spent the 2019 season with the Liberty, partaking in her first regular season action since 2016. Along with All-Star guard Kia Nurse, she was one of two players to partake in each of the Liberty's 34 games that season. Gray reached double-figures in scoring in each of her first three games. On June 28, Gray sank the winning free throw and posted a double-double in the Liberty's 69–68 win over the Dallas Wings. Two days later, Gray put up a career-best 15 rebounds in a win over Atlanta. The year ended with Gray posting matching career-best averages of 5.2 points and rebounds a game. Gray was waived by the Liberty on May 26, 2020.

The following season, Gray signed with the Los Angeles Sparks.

Overseas
In the 2015-16 WNBA off-season, Gray played in Italy for Dike Napoli. In August 2016, Gray re-signed with Dike Napoli for the 2016-17 WNBA off-season. In 2017, Gray signed with the Incheon Shinhan Bank S-Birds of the South Korean league for the 2017-18 WNBA off-season. In 2018, Gray signed with the Uni Győr of the Hungarian league for the 2018-19 WNBA off-season.
2019-2020 South Korean League (WKBL) was drafted with the 4th pick in the second round of the 2019-20 WKBL Draft by the Asan Woori Bank Wibee

WNBA career statistics

Regular season

|-
| style='text-align:left;'|2015
| style='text-align:left;'|Minnesota
| 10 || 0 || 3.7 || .429 || .000 || .000 || 1.0 || 0.1 || 0.2 || 0.2 || 0.4 || 0.6
|-
| style='text-align:left;'| 2015
| style='text-align:left;'| Atlanta
| 17 || 1 || 14.8 || .493 || .000 || .733 || 2.8 || 0.2 || 0.4 || 0.4 || 0.9 || 5.9
|-
| style='text-align:left;'| 2016
| style='text-align:left;'| Atlanta
| 28 || 5 || 9.6 || .521 || .000 || .556 || 2.5 || 0.1 || 0.1 || 0.1 || 0.6 || 3.4
|-
| style='text-align:left;'| 2019
| style='text-align:left;'| New York
| 34 || 10 || 15.3 || .473 || .500 || .565 || 5.2 || 0.5 || 0.5 || 0.2 || 1.2 || 5.2
|-
| style='text-align:left;'| 2020
| style='text-align:left;'| Los Angeles
| 10 || 0 || 6.2 || .364 || .000 || .857 || 2.8 || 0.3 || 0.1 || 0.4 || 1.0 || 1.4
|-
| style='text-align:left;'|2021
| style='text-align:left;'|New York
| 15 || 0 || 14.0 || .531 || .222 || .692 || 3.5 || 0.3 || 0.3 || 0.3|| 1.4 || 5.9
|-
| style='text-align:left;'|2022
| style='text-align:left;'|Seattle
| 11 || 0 || 7.7 || .500 || .667 || .833 || 2.2 || 0.1 || 0.2 || 0.0 || 0.8 || 2.5
|-
| style='text-align:left;'|2022
| style='text-align:left;'|Phoenix
| 16 || 0 || 9.5 || .405 || .091 || .333 || 1.8 || 0.6 || 0.3 || 0.3 || 1.1 || 2.0
|-
| style='text-align:left;'| Career
| style='text-align:left;'| 6 years, 6 teams
| 141 || 16 || 11.2 || .485 || .231 || .628 || 3.1 || 0.3 || 0.3 || 0.2 || 1.0 || 3.8

Postseason

|-
| align="left" | 2016
| align="left" | Atlanta
| 2 || 0 || 3.5 || .000 || .000 || .000 || 0.5 || 0.0 || 0.0 || 0.0 || 0.0 || 0.0
|-
| align="left" | 2020
| align="left" | Los Angeles
| 1 || 0 || 1.0 || 1.000 || .000 || .000 || 1.0 || 0.0 || 1.0 || 0.0 || 0.0 || 2.0
|-
| align="left" | 2021
| align="left" | New York
| 1 || 0 || 9.0 || 1.000 || 1.000 || 1.000 || 2.0 || 1.0 || 1.0 || 0.0 || 2.0 || 8.0
|-
| align="left" | 2022
| align="left" | Phoenix
| 2 || 0 || 8.0 || .400 || .000 || .500 || 1.0 || 0.0 || 0.0 || 0.0 || 0.5 || 2.5
|-
| align="left" | Career
| align="left" | 4 years, 4 teams
| 6 || 0 || 5.5 || .545 || 1.000 || .667 || 1.0 || 0.2 || 0.3 || 0.0 || 0.5 || 2.5
|}

Personal life
Gray has three brothers and three sisters.

References

External links
#21 Reshanda Gray - California (2013-14) - Women's Basketball State
Reshanda Gray ESPN player evaluation
USA Basketball:Reshanda Gray

1993 births
Living people
All-American college women's basketball players
American women's basketball players
Atlanta Dream players
Basketball players from Los Angeles
California Golden Bears women's basketball players
Los Angeles Sparks players
McDonald's High School All-Americans
Medalists at the 2013 Summer Universiade
Minnesota Lynx draft picks
Minnesota Lynx players
New York Liberty players
Parade High School All-Americans (girls' basketball)
People from Inglewood, California
Power forwards (basketball)
Seattle Storm players
Universiade gold medalists for the United States
Universiade medalists in basketball